Malacanthus is a small genus of tilefishes, family Malacanthidae. They are native to the western Atlantic Ocean and the Indian and Pacific Oceans.

Species
There are currently three recognized species in this genus:
 Malacanthus brevirostris Guichenot, 1848 (Quakerfish)
 Malacanthus latovittatus (Lacépède, 1801) (Blue blanquillo)
 Malacanthus plumieri (Bloch, 1786) (Sand tilefish)

References

Malacanthidae
Perciformes genera
Taxa named by Georges Cuvier